Peter Francis Hammond (June 30, 1887 – April 2, 1971) was a politician and member of the United States House of Representatives from Ohio for two months from November 1936 to January 1937.

Biography
Born in Lancaster, Ohio, he attended a private Catholic high school and entered college in Columbus, Ohio at Josephinum College. A tailor by trade, he opened his own clothing store in 1913. On November 3, 1936, Hammond was victorious in a special election to fill the remaining term of Mell G. Underwood. He served as a Democrat for several months, but did not run in the election held the same day for the following term. Following this, he briefly returned to his store, before becoming postmaster of Lancaster, Ohio in 1938. He retired from this position in 1954.

References
United States Congress biography

1887 births
1971 deaths
People from Lancaster, Ohio
Pontifical College Josephinum alumni
20th-century American politicians
Democratic Party members of the United States House of Representatives from Ohio